Haw Knob is a mountain located in the central Unicoi Mountains in the southeastern United States. It located near the Cherohala Skyway and is accessible via the Benton MacKaye Trail.

Geography
Haw Knob is located in the Cherokee National Forest in Tennessee and the Nantahala National Forest in North Carolina. The Cherohala Skyway runs along the prominence of the mountain, but the peak is only accessible via the Benton MacKaye Trail. Haw Knob also contains the highest elevation in Monroe County, Tennessee.

See also
Unicoi Mountains
Appalachian balds
Nantahala National Forest
Joyce Kilmer Memorial Forest

References

Landforms of Monroe County, Tennessee
Landforms of Graham County, North Carolina
Unicoi Mountains